Astbury Mere is a lake and open area in West Heath, a suburb of Congleton, Cheshire, England, in an area formerly quarried for silica sand. Part of the area is accredited by Natural England as a country park, Astbury Mere Country Park. The park is owned by Astbury Mere Trust, and the lake and its banks by Stoke-on-Trent Angling Society.

History
Extraction of silica sand occurred at the Congleton West Heath quarry from around the 1930s until 1984. The sand was used for making glass and for precision casting of metal. After the closure of the quarry, the site was divided into housing (Ennerdale Drive estate) and open space. A trust was established in 1989 to manage the open land. The park first opened to the public in 1991. In 2002, the Stoke-on-Trent Angling Society acquired the lake. By 2008 the Astbury Mere Trust had acquired the majority of the land. The park was accredited by Natural England as a country park in 2012.

Location and description

The park is located at around SJ846627 on Sandy Lane, off the A34 (Newcastle Road). The Fol Hollow road adjoins the park. The area forms a shallow bowl, centred on Astbury Mere, with surrounding grassland, woodland and plantation, as well as a community orchard, originally planted by local schoolchildren.

Facilities and activities
Activities in the park include walking, orienteering and running. Two walking trails are available, each a mile long; one is suitable for wheelchairs and pushchairs. Dogs are permitted. Seats are placed every 100 metres along the lake circuit. A permanent orienteering course is available. A parkrun is organised on Saturdays at 9am. Various watersports occur on the lake, including fishing, sailing, windsurfing, canoeing and kayaking; swimming is not permitted. Fishing is organised by Stoke-on-Trent Angling Society; the lake is stocked with carp, perch, pike and roach.

There is a visitor centre with car parking. Snacks and drinks are available. The park is managed by Cheshire East Council Countryside Ranger Service for the Astbury Mere Trust, with a single part-time ranger.

See also

List of parks and open spaces in Cheshire
Shakerley Mere, another Cheshire mere that originated in a sand quarry

References

Congleton
Parks and open spaces in Cheshire
Country parks in Cheshire
Lakes and reservoirs of Cheshire